Telephones - main lines in use:
19.52 million (2019)

Telephones - mobile cellular:
79.48 million (2019)

Telephone system:
well-developed, fully automated telephone and data services
domestic:
high-capacity cable and microwave radio relay trunks
international:
satellite earth stations - 3 Intelsat (with a total of 5 antennas - 3 for Atlantic Ocean and 2 for Indian Ocean), 1 Inmarsat (Atlantic Ocean region), and NA Eutelsat; 21 submarine cables.

Radio broadcast stations:
AM about 100, FM about 4,600, shortwave 9 (1998)

Radios:
50.5 million (1997)

Television broadcast stations:
358 (plus 4,728 repeaters) (1995)

Televisions:
30.5 million (1997)

Internet Hosts:
22.152 million (2009)

Internet users:
24.992 million (2008)

Country code (Top-level domain): .it

See also
 Media of Italy

References